Aporosa maingayi, synonym Aporosa isabellina, is a species of flowering plant in the family Phyllanthaceae. It is endemic to Peninsular Malaysia. It was first described by Joseph Dalton Hooker in 1887.

References

maingayi
Endemic flora of Peninsular Malaysia
Near threatened plants
Plants described in 1887
Taxonomy articles created by Polbot